José Antonio Escuredo Raimondez (born 19 January 1970 in Girona) is a former Spanish racing cyclist, specialising in track cycling. He has won three silver and one bronze world championship medals and a silver medal at the 2004 Summer Olympics. Escuredo has also won ten titles at the Spanish national track cycling championships. Escuredo mostly competed in the keirin and team sprint events.

References

External links

1970 births
Living people
Cyclists at the 1996 Summer Olympics
Cyclists at the 2000 Summer Olympics
Cyclists at the 2004 Summer Olympics
Olympic cyclists of Spain
Olympic silver medalists for Spain
Spanish male cyclists
Spanish track cyclists
Sportspeople from Girona
Olympic medalists in cycling
Medalists at the 2004 Summer Olympics
Cyclists from Catalonia
20th-century Spanish people
21st-century Spanish people